The Independence class is a class of littoral combat ships built for the United States Navy.

The hull design evolved from a project at Austal to design a high speed, 40-knot-cruise ship. That hull design evolved into the high-speed trimaran ferry  and the Independence class was then proposed by General Dynamics and Austal as a contender for Navy plans to build a fleet of smaller, agile, multipurpose warships to operate nearshore in the littoral zone. Initially two ships were approved, to compete with Lockheed Martin's  design.

Despite initial plans to only build ships of the winner out of the two competing Independence or Freedom classes, in 2010 the Navy announced plans to order up to ten additional ships of each class, for a total 12 ships per class. In March 2016 the Navy announced their intention to order an additional two ships, increasing the order to 13 ships of each class.

It was announced in early September 2016 that the first four vessels of the LCS program would be used as test ships rather than being deployed with the fleet. , nine ships have been commissioned. In February 2020 it was announced that the Navy plans to retire the first four LCS ships. On 20 June 2020, the US Navy announced that all four would be taken out of commission in March 2021, and will be placed in inactive reserve, because it would be too expensive to upgrade them to match the later ships in the class.

Planning and construction

Planning for a class of smaller, agile, multipurpose warships to operate in the littoral zone began in the early 2000s. In July 2003, a proposal by General Dynamics (partnering with Austal USA, the American subsidiary of Australian shipbuilder Austal) was approved by the Navy, with a contract for two vessels. These would then be compared to two ships built by Lockheed Martin to determine which design would be taken up by the Navy for a production run of up to 55 ships.

The first ship, Independence was laid down at the Austal USA shipyard in Mobile, Alabama, on 19 January 2006. The planned second ship was cancelled in November 2007, but reordered in May 2009, and laid down in December of that year as Coronado, shortly before Independence was launched.

The development and construction of Independence as of June 2009 was running at more than 3 times budget. The total projected cost for the ship is $704 million. The Navy had originally projected the cost at $220 million. Independence began builder's trials in July 2009, three days behind schedule because of maintenance issues. A leak in the port gas turbine saw the order of trials altered, but builder's and acceptance trials were completed by November, and although her first INSURV inspection revealed 2,080 deficiencies, these were rectified in time for the ship to be handed over to the Navy in mid-December, and commissioned in mid-January 2010.

Navy leaders said that the fixed price competition offered the Austal design an equal shot, in spite of its excess size, cost and limited service. After much inconsistency on how testing and orders were to proceed, in November 2010, the Navy asked that Congress approve ten of each of the Independence and Freedom classes.

Design 

The Independence-class design began life at Austal as a platform for a high-speed cruise ship. The principal requirements of that project were speed, stability and passenger comfort, and Austal's team determined that the trimaran hull form offered significant passenger comfort and stability advantages over both a catamaran and a monohull. The high-speed cruise ship project evolved into Austal's commercial high-speed trimaran ferry HSC Benchijigua Express. Their displacement is rated at 2,377 tons light, 3,228 tons full, and 851 tons deadweight. The standard ship's company is 40, although this can increase depending on the ship's role with mission-specific personnel. The habitability area with bunks is located under the bridge. The helm is controlled by joysticks instead of traditional steering wheels.

Austal claims that the design will use a third less fuel than the competing Freedom-class, but the Congressional Budget Office found that fuel would account for 18 percent or less of the total lifetime cost of Freedom. The lack of bridge wings on the Independence class had been noted as the top problem in the entire LCS program to the extent that these will need to be retrofitted onto existing ships. The lightweight aluminum construction of the Independence-class ships makes them more vulnerable to damage than the Freedom-class ships.

The first ships of both LCS classes were delivered before the designs were mature so that improvements could be built into future ships. The Navy is improving the Independence-class with bridge wings for safety and replacing the  Rigid Hull Inflatable Boat (RHIB) with a  boat. An improved cathodic protection system will enhance corrosion protection. Like the Freedom-class, the Independence vessels will be getting axial flow water jets which pushes water parallel to the shaft of the impeller to improve efficiency and reduce maintenance; they will also be upgraded to handle the horsepower provided by the gas turbine propulsion system. A winch control system will modulate the motion of the anchor to reduce the reliance on manual hand brakes. The mission bay side door will be redesigned for reliability and the platform lift elevator reconfigured to better handle weapons and ordnance.

Mission modules

The LCS is reconfigured for various roles by changing mission packages, each of which includes mission module equipment (weapon systems, sensors, etc.), carried craft and mission crews. Modules include Anti-submarine warfare (ASW), mine countermeasures (MCM), surface warfare (SUW), and special warfare missions. The MCM and SUW modules are planned to reach initial operating capability in Fiscal year 2014, and the ASW module in FY2016. Module changes were envisioned to allow a single LCS to change roles in a matter of hours at any commercial port allowing it to rapidly optimize effectiveness against a threat. A report from the Office of the Chief of Naval Operations (OPNAV) on a January 2012 sustainment wargame reportedly stated that, possibly for logistics reasons, the mission module changes may take as long as weeks, and that in the future the navy plans to use LCS ships with a single module, with module changes being a rare occurrence. In 2014, Independence switched from countermine to surface warfare modes in 96 hours on short notice.

In an 8 September 2016 announcement, the Navy revealed a radical change in operations and organization plans for the LCS. Of the 28 Flight 0 ships built or on order, the first four, two of each class, will be turned into training ships and the remaining 24 will be divided into six divisions of four ships each; three divisions of the Freedom class based at Naval Station Mayport, Florida and three divisions of the Independence class based at Naval Station San Diego, California. The new organization does away with the LCS' signature interchangeable mission module concept, with each division being tasked to fulfill one of the three mission sets. Crewing is also changed into a more simplified two-crew "blue/gold" model, like that used on submarines and minesweepers, where ships cycle to forward deployed locations with the two crews swapping roles every 4–5 months; aviation detachments will also deploy with the same LCS crew, creating an arrangement of a core 70-sailor crew to conduct the warfare mission and a 23-person air detachment.

Modular mission capability 

The Independence-class carries a default armament for self-defense, and command and control. Unlike traditional fighting ships with fixed armament such as guns and missiles, tailored mission modules can be configured for one mission package at a time. Modules may consist of manned aircraft, unmanned vehicles, off-board sensors, or mission-manning detachments. The interior volume and payload is greater than some destroyers and is sufficient to serve as a high-speed transport and maneuver platform. With  of payload volume, it was designed with enough payload and volume to carry out one mission with a separate mission module in reserve, allowing the ship to do multiple missions without having to be refitted.

One Mobicon Flexible Container Handling System is carried on each ship in order to move mission containers. In addition to cargo or container-sized mission modules, the bay can carry four lanes of multiple Strykers, armored Humvees, and their associated troops. An elevator allows air transport of packages the size of a  shipping container that can be moved into the mission bay while at sea. A side access ramp allows for vehicle roll-on/roll-off loading to a dock and would have allowed the ship to transport the since-cancelled Expeditionary Fighting Vehicle.

Armament and sensors

The Raytheon SeaRAM missile defense system is installed on the hangar roof. The SeaRAM combines the sensors of the Phalanx 1B close-in weapon system with an 11-missile launcher for the RIM-116 Rolling Airframe Missile, creating an autonomous system. The Independence-class ships also have an integrated LOS Mast, Sea Giraffe 3D Radar and SeaStar Safire FLIR. Northrop Grumman has demonstrated sensor fusion of on and off-board systems in the Integrated Combat Management System (ICMS) used on the LCS. The vessels have an Interior Communications Center that can be curtained off from the rest of bridge instead of the heavily protected Combat Information Center found on other Navy warships.

Side and forward surfaces are angled for reduced radar profile. The  is designed for operations from Independence-class ships. The flight deck, can support the operation of two SH-60 Seahawk helicopters, multiple unmanned aerial vehicles, or one CH-53 Sea Stallion helicopter. H-60 series helicopters provide airlift, rescue, anti-submarine, radar picket and anti-ship capabilities with torpedoes and missiles. First flight of a TERN demonstrator is expected in 2017. The trimaran hull will allow flight operations up to sea state 5. Austal USA vice president Craig Hooper has responded to critics of the class's light armament by suggesting that the ships employ long range drones instead.

On 8 March 2017,  successfully test fired a vertical-launched AGM-114 Hellfire missile, the first such launch from a littoral combat ship. The Hellfire system on littoral combat ships is meant to engage smaller agile vessels and strike targets on land.

In late July 2014, the US Navy confirmed that the Naval Strike Missile would be tested aboard the littoral combat ship . The test occurred successfully on 24 September 2014. Kongsberg and Raytheon teamed to pitch the NSM to equip the LCS as its over-the-horizon anti-ship missile in 2015. By May 2017, the extended-range Boeing RGM-84 Harpoon and Lockheed Martin LRASM had been withdrawn from the Navy's Over-the-Horizon Weapon System (OTH-WS) competition, leaving the NSM as the only remaining contender. On 31 May 2018, the Navy officially selected the NSM to serve as the LCS' OTH anti-ship weapon. The $14.8 million initial contract award to Raytheon calls for the delivery of Kongsberg-designed "encanistered missiles loaded into launching mechanisms; and a single fire control suite,” and buys about a dozen missiles; the entire contract value could grow to $847.6 million if all contract options are exercised. The NSM will be designated as the RGM-184A in US service.

Control system

The control system for this class is provided by General Dynamics Advanced Information Systems through an open architecture computing infrastructure (OPEN CI), while Lockheed provides their own control system for their variant of the LCS. OPEN CI includes the information technology (IT) infrastructure for the combat and seaframe control systems. This IT infrastructure also includes the primary operator interface for the control and monitoring of mission module operations. The General Dynamics OPEN CI is also used on the Austal-built .

Corrosion management
After the lead ship of the class suffered from aggressive disintegration due to galvanic corrosion, Austal has made changes to the remaining ships in the class. Coronado will have "new anti-corrosion surface treatments", and Jackson will have "an array of tested corrosion-management tools and processes".

Hull cracks 
On 10 May 2022, it was reported that six of the Navy's fleet of 13 Independence class LCS suffered from hull cracks above the waterline where the deck plate and shell plate join. The cracks may develop if the ships travel faster than 15 knots in seas with maximum wave heights of about eight feet. The issue was first identified in 2019 in the second commissioned ship, Coronado. The solution to the issue was to replace the deck plate and shell plate with plates of thicker material. Austal making a statement that the cracks do not "pose a risk to the safety of Sailors on board the ships" and NAVSEA stating that the cracks do not affect the ships' ability to execute their missions; however, at least one of the affected ships, Omaha, was under speed and sea state restrictions.

Small Surface Combatant
In December 2014, the Navy's recommendation to base the Small Surface Combatant on upgraded versions of both Independence and Freedom LCSs was accepted. The SSC is an attempt by the Navy to increase the LCS' firepower and protection. Although Austal submitted improvements including vertical launch systems, 76 mm guns, and advanced combat systems and sensors, the Navy opted to keep the 57 mm gun, not add a VLS, and chose to add an upgraded 3-D radar. Other changes included installation of an unspecified over-the-horizon missile, Mark 38 25 mm guns, a torpedo countermeasures system, a multifunction towed array system, installation of a SeaRAM launcher (on the Freedom-class), an upgraded countermeasures decoy system, an upgraded electronic warfare system, armor added to vital spaces, and improved signature management. The SSC will focus on Surface Warfare (SUW) and Anti-submarine Warfare (ASW) with these additions, as well as retaining all other features of their mission packages; the SSC is not required to perform MCM, which will continue to be handled by the LCS. The vessels will retain a degree of modularity to concentrate on one mission set and will still have mission bays, although they may be reduced. SSC vessels are planned to begin procurement by 2019, and it is being investigated if the enhancements can be added to existing LCS hulls.

Derivative designs
Austal has proposed a much smaller and slower trimaran, called the 'Multi Role Vessel' (MRV 80). Though it is only half the size of their LCS design, it would still be useful for border protection and counter piracy operations.

Austal unsuccessfully entered the FFG(X) competition for the US Navy's new class of 20 frigates, unveiling a larger more heavily armed design called the "Austal Frigate" in April 2017; and their Frigate design was selected as one of the five finalists. Based on the Independence LCS trimaran hull, it features a slightly shorter flight deck for an aft section that can hold eight anti-ship missiles, an addition to the eight missile launchers in the forward section for 16 total. The Austal Frigate design can also feature an optional 16-cell Mk 41 VLS. For anti-submarine warfare a variable depth sonar is planned as well as a towed array with its handling system.

Ships

Ship order and naming history
The Navy originally ordered two Independence-class littoral combat ships, the lead ship Independence (LCS-2) and Coronado (LCS-4), named in March 2009 by then-Secretary of the Navy Donald C. Winter, with odd numbers being used for Freedom-class littoral combat ships. On 29 December 2010, the Navy announced that it would be ordering up to ten additional Independence-class ships, for a total of 12 ships in the class. In February 2012, Secretary Mabus announced that the fifth ship of the class will be named , and the sixth named . The Navy announced the name  in April 2013  the following June.

On 11 March 2014, the Navy awarded contract options to fund construction of LCS-18 and LCS-20, the seventh and eighth ships in a 10-ship contract. On 1 April 2015, the Navy awarded build contracts for LCS-22 and LCS-24 to Austal USA. On 20 August 2015, Secretary Mabus announced that the twelfth ship would be named .

On 31 March 2016, Austal announced the order to build the thirteenth Independence-class vessel with a congressional cost cap of $564 million, which had been placed as an option under Austal's existing 10-vessel block-buy contract. LCS-26 will be the eleventh vessel built under that contract and the thirteenth Independence-class vessel overall (the first two ships, Independence and Coronado were built prior to award of the 10-vessel contract). In September 2016, Secretary Mabus announced the name of the next ship, . On 26 June 2017, Austal announced the order to build the fourteenth Independence-class vessel with a congressional cost cap of $584 million. On 8 October 2017 Austal announced the order for LCS-30, the fifteenth ship of the class, to be built at a cost under the congressional cost cap of $584 million. On 13 February 2018, Navy Secretary Richard V. Spencer announced the name of LCS-28 as Savannah, and on 23 February 2018, President Donald Trump announced the name of LCS-30 as Canberra.

On 18 September 2018, the Navy announced that two additional Independence-class ships, and one Freedom-class ship, have been ordered, with hull numbers LCS-32, LCS-34 and LCS-29 respectively. On 10 October 2018, Navy Secretary Richard Spencer announced the names of LCS-29 as Beloit, for Beloit, Wisconsin and LCS-32 as Santa Barbara, for Santa Barbara, California.

On 16 December 2018, the Navy announced that two additional Independence-class ships have been ordered with hull numbers LCS-36, and LCS-38.

Ships in class

Plan to retire LCS hulls
During planning for the FY21 Budget proposal, Navy recommended the decommissioning of hulls 1–4 in 2021, some 10 years ahead of prior planning. This was explained by Chief of Naval Operations, Admiral Mike Gilday, during the WEST Conference on 2 March 2020, when he said: 

There was also a comment that it would cost another $2 billion to get the first four hulls prepped for sea duty.

In May 2021, the Navy confirmed it would decommission the first two littoral combat ships in 2021. On 29 July 2021, the Navy decommissioned .  was decommissioned on 29 September 2021. Both ships will join the reserve fleet.

In June 2021, the Navy released an abbreviated long-range shipbuilding report to Congress, which included ships planned to be decommissioned during fiscal year 2022. All four ships would be placed Out of Commission in Reserve and retained as reactivation candidates.

In popular culture
USS Independence appears in the Discovery Channel documentary Inside: A 21st Century Warship, which also features .

See also
 Freedom-class littoral combat ship
 Independence-class littoral mission vessel
 HSV Sea Slice, SLICE catamaran
 Sea Fighter (FSF-1), SWATH catamaran
 , stealth catamaran
 , British trimaran warship demonstrator

References

External links

 Independence-class littoral combat ships on Austal USA official website

 

 
Naval ships of the United States
Trimarans
Military trimarans